Mavis Villiers (born Mavis Clare Cooney; 10 December 190923 February 1976) was an Australian-born British actress of stage, film and television. Her parents were John Cooney and Clara Smythe. Her brother, Cecil Cooney, was a camera operator and cinematographer. Her stage name, Villiers, was taken from her maternal grandfather.

Life and career
Mavis emigrated to the United States with her family in 1921, aged 11. The family settled in Hollywood, where her father became a technician at a film company. Both Mavis and her brother Cecil began their careers in the silent era. Much of her activity as a child actress in Hollywood is lost or uncredited; her first accredited film role was as 'the Girl' in a 1927 short comedy, The Bum's Rush, featuring expat Australian star Snub Pollard. Following her parents' divorce, Mavis and her mother Clara migrated to London in 1933. Her brother Cecil followed at some stage; her father remained in California where he died at Ventura in 1960.

Her stage roles included that of Mrs Van Mier in the 1962 London production of Noël Coward's Sail Away at the Savoy Theatre. She was also in the cast of the 1957 West End production of Damn Yankees at the London Coliseum; this production featured Australian actor Bill Kerr as Mr. Applegate. Her sole appearance on the American Broadway stage, was in the role of Aunt Lizzy Sweeney, in the first Broadway production of Brian Friel's Philadelphia Here I Come! at the Helen Hayes Theatre in 1966; she also played the same role in the 1975 film version of that play, her last role before her death.
 
She had appeared in films from 1927 to 1975. Some of her more prominent film roles were in:The Bum's Rush (1927), Saloon Bar (1940), South American George (1941)One Exciting Night (1944), Suddenly, Last Summer (1959), Victim (1961), and Philadelphia, Here I Come! (1975).

Her television appearances between 1938 and 1972, include roles in various productions, series and episodes. They include the BBC's Sunday Night Theatre, Douglas Fairbanks, Jr., Presents, Educated Evans, The Vise, The Twilight Zone, The Saint (TV series), From a Bird's Eye View and Night Gallery.

Personal life
Mavis met her future husband, Captain Donald E. Miller, at the American Eagle Club in Charing Cross Road, London, in 1941. She was working at American Eagle Club at the time. Miller was a Pilot Officer in the American Eagle Squadrons attached to the Royal Air Force. He was subsequently shot down over Germany and taken prisoner for two years until released on VE day in 1945. The couple were married in London on 16 June 1945 and planned to settle in the United States after Mavis had completed a contractual obligation to appear in a French film, Le Battalion du ciel (1946) (1946).

Before they could be reunited, Donald, now working for Pan-American Airways in San Francisco, died from injuries sustained in a car accident on 4 April 1946, nine months after their marriage. The union was childless; she did not remarry.

Mavis Villiers died from pneumonia at her Paddington flat in 1976, aged 66.

Selected filmography

 Little Lord Fauntleroy (1921) - Little Girl (uncredited)
 Tess of the Storm Country (1922) - Girl in Church (uncredited)
 Old Age Handicap (1928)
 A Lady's Morals (1930) - Selma
 King of the Castle (1936) - Billie
 Double Alibi (1937) - Miss Grant
 It's Never Too Late to Mend (1937) - Betty
 The Nursemaid Who Disappeared (1939)
 An Englishman's Home (1940) - Dolly
 Saloon Bar (1940) - Joan
 Sailors Don't Care (1940) - Blondie
 Gasbags (1941) - American Girl (uncredited)
 South American George (1941) - Mts. Durrant
 Hi Gang! (1941) - Botticelli's Secretary
 Went the Day Well? (1942) - Violet (uncredited)
 One Exciting Night (1944) - Mabel
 Corridor of Mirrors (1948) - Babs
 I Was a Male War Bride (1949) - Dependents' Hotel Reception Clerk (uncredited)
 Pool of London (1951) - Drinking Club Blonde (uncredited)
 Cheer the Brave (1951)
 I Believe in You (1952) - Prostitute (uncredited)
 Time Is My Enemy (1954) - Gladys
 The Mouse That Roared (1959) - Telephone Operator (uncredited)
 Suddenly, Last Summer (1959) - Miss Foxhill
 A Touch of Larceny (1959) - Adele Parrish
 Victim (1960) - Madge
 The Roman Spring of Mrs. Stone (1961) - Mrs. Coogan
 The Boys (1962) - Celia Barker
 The Haunting (1963) - Landlady (uncredited)
 Promise Her Anything (1966) - Rusty's Mother
 Straight On till Morning (1972) - Indian Princess
 Baxter! (1973) - Woman in Aircraft
 No Sex Please, We're British (1973) - American Lady
 Philadelphia, Here I Come!'' (1975) - Liz Sweeney (final film role)

External links

BFI.org
TCM.com

Footnotes

1911 births
1976 deaths
Actresses from Sydney
Australian emigrants to England
Australian emigrants to the United States
Australian film actresses
Australian stage actresses
Australian television actresses
British film actresses
British stage actresses
British television actresses
Deaths from pneumonia in England
People from Paddington
20th-century British actresses